Oxytrigona tataira, commonly known as the tataíra or abelha-de-fogo (Brazilian Portuguese: "fire bee"), is a species of eusocial stingless bee in the family Apidae and tribe Meliponini.

References 

Meliponini
Hymenoptera of South America
Hymenoptera of Brazil
Insects described in 1863